Col. Saeed Musa Muragha ( ) (1927 – 29 January 2013) was a former captain in the Jordanian army until he defected and joined the PLO in 1970.  He is well known among Palestinians as Abu Musa.

Early years
Abu Musa was born in Silwan. As a Palestinian, Abu Musa joined the Jordanian Army in 1948 and rose to become commander of an artillery battalion in 1969. During this period he was sent to receive a military education at the prestigious British Sandhurst Military Academy. In October 1970, after the Black September fighting, Abu Musa left the Jordanian army to join the PLO and relocated with most of the Palestinian Resistance to Lebanon. Here Abu Musa rose to command an alliance between the PLO and Lebanese militias, which fought the Syrians when Syria intervened in the Lebanese Civil War in 1976. In 1978 the Syrian government unsuccessfully attempted to assassinate him.

Split with Arafat
Abu Musa became deputy chief of operations for the PLO and led the PLO's defense of Beirut in 1982 from the Israelis.
However Abu Musa fell out with Yassir Arafat, head of Fatah and PLO, in May 1983. Abu Musa publicly complained over corrupt practices within the PLO, especially the promotion of political appointees loyal to Arafat to important military posts. He was also known for hardline views on Israel, and outspoken in his opposition to what he saw as Arafat's attempt to reach a negotiated solution to the conflict (see Rejectionist Front).

In November 1983 Abu Musa was expelled from the PLO's military and he formed Fatah Uprising (or Fatah al-Intifada in Arabic) in opposition to Arafat. With the backing of Syria, who opposed any negotiations with Israel, Abu Musa led his followers to drive Arafat's PLO from northern Lebanon.

In 1984 Abu Musa led Fatah Uprising to join the Palestinian National Alliance in Damascus in opposition to the PLO but failed to get a majority of Palestinian support. He would join the Palestinian National Salvation Front in 1985 and oppose the Oslo Accords in 1993. Abu Musa retreated from his leadership role in the 1990s and would no longer be active from then on.

References

1927 births
2013 deaths
Palestinian militants
Palestinian rebels
People of the Lebanese Civil War